Maryna Prokofyeva (born February 4, 1982) is a Ukrainian judoka.

She finished in joint fifth place in the heavyweight (+78 kg) division at the 2004 Summer Olympics, having lost the bronze medal match to Sun Fuming of China.

Achievements

External links
 
 

1982 births
Living people
Ukrainian female judoka
Judoka at the 2000 Summer Olympics
Judoka at the 2004 Summer Olympics
Judoka at the 2008 Summer Olympics
Olympic judoka of Ukraine
Universiade medalists in judo
Universiade bronze medalists for Ukraine
Sportspeople from Mariupol
21st-century Ukrainian women